James Henry Stock (17 December 1855 – 14 June 1907) was an English Conservative Party politician.

He was the Member of Parliament (MP) for Liverpool Walton from 1892 to 1906.

References

External links 
 

1855 births
1907 deaths
Members of the Parliament of the United Kingdom for Liverpool constituencies
UK MPs 1892–1895
UK MPs 1895–1900
UK MPs 1900–1906
Conservative Party (UK) MPs for English constituencies